Darren Robert Russell Robinson (born 29 December 2004) is a Northern Irish professional footballer who plays as a midfielder for  club Derby County.

Club career
Having joined the club from Portadown in 2019, Robinson signed his first professional contract with Dungannon Swifts in January 2021. During the 2020–21 season, he spent time training at English clubs Fleetwood Town, Stoke City and Derby County. He made his first-team debut for Dungannon Swifts on 29 May 2021 as a late substitute against Glenavon, and it was announced that Robinson had joined EFL Championship club Derby County on a three-year professional contract two days later. After Derby County went into administration in November 2021, it was reported that Dungammon Swifts were owed £36,000 for the transfer of Robinson.

On 15 January 2022, he was named on Derby's first-team bench for their 2–0 win over Sheffield United, having impressed for both the under-18 and under-23 teams. He made his debut for Derby on 23 April 2022 as a 82nd-minute substitute in a 3–1 defeat to Bristol City.

International career
Robinson was called up to the Northern Ireland under-19 team in March 2022. He made 3 appearances during the March 2022 international break.

Career statistics

References

External links

2004 births
Living people
Association footballers from Northern Ireland
Association football midfielders
Portadown F.C. players
Dungannon Swifts F.C. players
Derby County F.C. players
NIFL Premiership players
English Football League players
Northern Ireland youth international footballers